The jejunal arteries are branches of the superior mesenteric artery which supply blood to the jejunum.

External links

Arteries of the abdomen